Poovaipalayam, also called "Sithakkaattur" (population approximately 1500 in 2021) is a village in Dindigul district, Tamil Nadu, India. It is 8 km from the nearest town, Vedasandur, and 22 km from the district headquarters, Dindigul. The villagers are primarily farmers who grow drumsticks, onion, chili peppers, gooseberry, tomato, eggplants, tobacco, and lentils. The villagers belong to the Kongu Vellala Gounder community. Poovaipalayam is under Oddancatram taluk and in the same constituency.

Geography
Located at 10°31′51″N 77°53′55″E, Poovaipalayam is approximately 2500 km from New Delhi, 1350 km from Mumbai, 450 km from Chennai, 360 km from Bangalore and 140 km from Coimbatore, 80 km from Madurai. It is surrounded by mountains.

Demographics
As of the 2001 census, Poovaipalayam had a population of 700. Men constitute 55 percent of the population and women 45 percent. Poovaipalayam has an average literacy rate of 71 percent, higher than the national average of 59.5 percent; the male literacy rate is 81 percent, and the female literacy rate is 61 percent. Two percent of the population is under six years of age.

Transportation
Poovaipalayam does not have any public transportation that connects directly to it; people generally use their own vehicles to travel outside the village. The nearest public transportation is one kilometer away.

Temples
There are several Hindu temples in the area:

 Sri Vinayakar Temple 
 Sri Kuppanna Swamy Temple 
 Sri Kannimar Temple (Main God)
 Sri Karumalai Perumal Temple (at the top of the Karumalai)
 Sri Kallambarai Kannimar Temple (Sengattu Thottam)

Banks 

Indian Overseas Bank Saalaiyur Naalroad
Bank of India Puliyamarathukottai
State bank of India Vedasandur 
Tamil Nadu mercantile bank Vedasandur 
Canara bank Vedasandur 
Karur vysya bank Vedasandur 
Indian bank Vedasandur

Education
There is one elementary school in the village, but it has been closed permanently due to lower enrollment.

References

Villages in Dindigul district